The Speedway Grand Prix of Nordic was a motorcycle speedway event that was a part of the Speedway Grand Prix Series. It was the second Grand Prix event in Denmark. It was staged between 2009 and 2014 at the Speedway Center in Vojens.

Winners

Most wins 
 Andreas Jonsson 2 times

See also 
 Speedway Grand Prix
 Nordic countries

Nordic
International sports competitions hosted by Denmark
Grand Prix